Gordon Carey Morrissey  (8 July 1894 – 8 March 1970) was an Australian rules footballer who played for the Melbourne University Football Club while a medical student at Melbourne University. Due to the declaration of World War I, Morrissey only played in 2 VFL games.

Morrissey served in World War I before embarking on a medical career in Ingham, Queensland. He was appointed an Officer of the Order of the British Empire for his work in addressing an outbreak of Leptospirosis in the Ingham region in the 1930s through introducing the practice of burning cane before harvesting. He later became superintendent of Ingham Hospital.

References

1894 births
1970 deaths
Australian general practitioners
Australian military personnel of World War I
Officers of the Order of the British Empire
Australian rules footballers from Melbourne
University Football Club players
People from Alphington, Victoria
Military personnel from Melbourne
University of Melbourne alumni
Medical doctors from Melbourne